Anelosimus sulawesi is a small species of spiders in the family Theridiidae.  It is known only from Dumoga Bone National Park, Sulawesi, Indonesia.  The name derives from the location it was discovered. The holotype male is  total length, while a female of the same species was measured to be .  The coloration is brown with some white on the dorsal folium, similar to other species in Anelosimus.

References

Theridiidae
Spiders of Indonesia
Spiders described in 2006